Marias barn ("Maria's Child") was the Sveriges Television's Christmas calendar in 1987. It was an animated series based on the New Testament stories of Virgin Mary's son, Jesus.

Plot

The stories are based on Danish writer Cecil Bødker's two novels, who in turn are based on the New Testament and other older stories about Jesus, as Cecil Bødker tried to reflect life in Ancient Egypt and Palestine upon the time Jesus was born. It follows the story all the way from the birth of Jesus to his crucifixion. It was narrated by Ulla Sjöblom and featured drawings by Bengt Arne Runnerström.

The series was made in response to pressure for the Christmas calendar to feature more Christian content. However, its portrayal of the children of Bethlehem being murdered on the order of Herod the Great was criticized for being too graphic.

References

External links 
 

1987 Swedish television series debuts
1987 Swedish television series endings
Bible in popular culture
Sveriges Television's Christmas calendar
Swedish animated television series
1980s animated television series
Television series set in the Roman Empire